Achyrocline satureioides, commonly known as marcela, is a species of plant in the family Asteraceae. It is native to South America, from Argentina to Colombia to Guyana. A semi-annual herbaceous plant reaching about a meter tall, it has simple, narrow green leaves with serrated edges. It produces yellow flowers in racemes around Easter.

Uses 
It is used as the medicinal plant symbol of Rio Grande do Sul state in Brazil. This plant is widely used in various countries which share the Guarani cultural heritage such as Paraguay, Uruguay, and northern Argentina

The species' extract, which contains isorhamnetin, luteolin, and quercetin, is used to fight herpes.

It is also used extensively in South Portugal, in bonfires during popular celebrations where people enjoyed the smell of burnt marcela and chorizos... when unavailable, people would simply open shellfish in the fire pit, eat them with a bit of lemon and make traditional constructions from the leftover shells, an art passed throughout multiple generations.

References

External links
Achyrocline satureioides 

satureioides
Flora of Argentina
Flora of Brazil
Flora of Uruguay
Flora of the Cerrado
Flora of Rio Grande do Sul
Medicinal plants of South America
Herbs
Taxa named by Augustin Pyramus de Candolle
Taxa named by Jean-Baptiste Lamarck